Danielle is a modern French female variant of the male name Daniel, meaning "God is my judge" in the Hebrew language.

Variants
Dana – Czech, German, Romanian Polish
Danette – English
Daniela – Bulgarian, Czech, Danish, English, German, Italian, Macedonian, Norwegian, Polish, Portuguese, Romanian, Slovene, Spanish, Swedish, Slovak, Latvian
Danièle – French
Daniélín - Irish
Daniella – English, Italian, Hungarian
Danielle – English, French, Odia
Daniëlle – Dutch
Danijela – Croatian, Serbian, Slovene
Danita – English
Danna – English
Dannielle – English
Danniella – English
Danuta – Polish
Danielė – Lithuanian
 دانيال – Arabic
 Даніэль (Danieĺ) Даніэла (Daniella) – Belarusian
 ড্যানিয়েল (Ḍyāniẏēla) – Bengali
 丹妮尔 (Dānnīěr) – Chinese Simplified
 丹妮爾 (Dānnīěr) – Chinese Traditional
 ડેનિયલ (Ḍēniyala) – Gujarati
 דניאל – Hebrew
 डेनिएल (Ḍēni'ēla) – Hindi
 ダニエル (Danieru) – Japanese
 ಡೇನಿಯಲ್ (Ḍēniyal) – Kannada
 다니엘 (Daniel) – Korean
 دانیل – Persian
 ਡੈਨਯਲਾ (Ḍainayalā) – Punjabi
 Даниэль (Daniel'), Даниэлла (Daniella) – Russian
 Данијела (Danijela) – Serbian
 டேனியல் (Ṭēṉiyal) – Tamil
 డేనియల్ (Ḍēniyal) – Telugu
 แดเนียล (Daeniao or Daenian) – Thai
 Даніель (Danielʹ), Даніелла (Daniella) – Ukrainian
 ڈینیل – Urdu
 דאַניעל (Dʼanyʻl) – Yiddish

People with the name

Males
Danielle Hunter (born 1994), American football player (first name pronounced  )

Females
Danielle Parks (born Oakland California), Transsexual
Danielle Adams (born 1989), American basketball player
Danielle Andersen (born 1984), American professional poker player
Danielle Anderson (born 1986), American singer
Danielle Ammaccapane (born 1965), American professional golfer
Danielle Arbid (born 1970),  Lebanese film director
Danielle Bradbery (born 1992), American singer
Danielle Bregoli (born 2003), American social media personality and rapper
Danielle Brooks (born 1989), American actress and plus-size model
Danielle Bunten Berry (1949–1998), videogame designer
Danielle Bux (born 1979), Welsh actress
Daniela Calvetti, Italian-American mathematician
Danielle Campbell (born 1995), American actress
Danielle Collins (born 1993), American tennis player
Danielle Collins (cricketer) (born 2000), English cricketer
Danielle Darrieux (1917–2017), French actress
Danielle Dax (born 1958), British musician
Dani Dyer (born 1996), British actress and television personality
Danielle Egnew (born 1969), American musician and actress
Danielle Eubank (born 1968), American painter
Danielle Fishel (born 1981), American actress
Danielle Foote (born 1987), Australian television personality
Danielle Frenkel (born 1987), Israeli high jump champion
Danielle Galligan (born 1992), Irish actress and theatre maker
Danielle Goldstein (born 1985), American-Israeli show jumper
Danielle Haim (born 1989), American rock singer-songwriter, guitarist, drummer
Danielle Harold (born 1992), English actress
Dani Harmer (born 1989), British actress, television presenter and former singer
Danielle Harris (born 1977), American actress
Danielle Hope (born 1992), English actress and singer
Danielle Howle, American folk-rock singer-songwriter
Danielle Licari, French singer
Danielle Lloyd (born 1983), English model and television personality
Danielle Riley Keough, known as Riley Keough (born  in 1989), American actress
Daniella Kromm (born 2004), German rhythmic gymnast
Danielle Lloyd (born 1983), former Miss Great Britain and Celebrity Big Brother contestant
Danielle Marcano (born 1997), American soccer player
Danielle McCann, Canadian politician
Danielle McEwan (born 1991), American ten-pin bowler
Dannii Minogue (born 1971) Australian pop singer, actress, and television personality 
Danielle Nicolet (born 1973), American actress
Danielle de Niese (born 1979), Australian-American opera singer
Danielle Page (born 1986), American-Serbian basketball player
Danielle Panabaker (born 1987), American actress
Danielle Renfrew (born 1973), American film producer
Danielle Robinson (born 1989), American basketball player
Danielle Rodriguez (born 1992), American basketball coach and player
Danielle Rowe (born 1982), Australian ballet dancer and choreographer
Danielle Rowley (born 1990), Scottish politician
Danielle Rose Russell (born 1999), American actress
Danielle Scott-Arruda (born 1971), American volleyball player
Danielle Smith (born 1971), Canadian politician
Danielle Spencer (US actress) (born 1969), American and Australian actress
Danielle Steers (born 1991) English stage actress and singer-songwriter
Danielle Steel (born 1947), American writer
Dani Stevenson (born 1980), American singer
Danielle Trzcinski, American comedian
Danielle White (born 1992), American child singer

Fictional characters
Danielle Jones, character on the British soap opera EastEnders
Danielle Moonstar, character in Marvel Comics
Danielle Rousseau, character in the American television series Lost

Daniëlle
Daniëlle Bekkering (born 1976), Dutch speed skater and cyclist. Daniela Pozo
Daniëlle de Bruijn (born 1978), Dutch water polo player
Daniëlle van de Donk (born 1991), Dutch footballer
Daniëlle Overgaag (born 1973), Dutch road cyclist
Daniëlle van Rossem (born 1935), Dutch fencer
Daniëlle Vriezema (born 1977), Dutch judoka

Danièle and Daniele
Daniele, a list of people

Daniela
 Daniela Anahí Bessia, Italian-Argentinian singer
 Daniela Akerblom, Canadian actress
 Daniela Anschütz-Thoms, German speed skater
 Daniela Alves Lima, Brazilian football player
 Daniela Bártová, Czech tennis player
 Daniela Bianchi, Italian actress
 Daniela Bobadilla, Canadian-Mexican teen actress
 Daniela Castro, Mexican actress and singer
 Daniela Ceccarelli, Italian Alpine skier
 Daniela Cicarelli, Brazilian model
 Daniela Clynes, English vocalist
 Daniela Dahn, German writer
 Daniela de Jesus Cosio, Mexican model
 Daniela Denby-Ashe, English actress
 Daniela Filipiová, Czech politician
 Daniela Hantuchová, Slovak tennis player
 Dani Karlsson, Swedish model
 Daniela Katzenberger, German reality TV star, singer and model 
 Daniela Klemenschits, Austrian tennis player
 Daniela Kolářová, Czech actress
 Daniela Mărănducă, Romanian gymnast
 Daniela Melchior, Portuguese actress
 Daniela Mercury, South American singer
 Daniela Peštová, Czech model
 Daniela Rocca, Italian actress
 Daniela Romo, Mexican actress and singer
 Daniela Ruah, Portuguese-American actress
 Daniela L. Rus, Romanian-American roboticist
 Daniela Samulski, German swimmer
 Daniela Sanzone, Italian journalist
 Daniela Sea, American actress
 Daniela Silivaş, Romanian gymnast
 Daniela Simmons, Swiss singer
 Daniela Urzi, Argentine model
 Daniela Varela, Portuguese singer
 Daniela Ziegler, German actress and singer

Daniella
 Daniella Alonso, American actress and fashion model
 Daniella Álvarez (born 1988), Colombian model
 Daniella Busk (born 1993), Swedish sprinter
 Daniella Cicarelli (born 1978), Brazilian model and television host
 Daniella Dooling (born 1967), American artist
 Daniella Dragojevic (born 1989), Danish handball player
 Daniella Evangelista (born 1982), Canadian actress and model
 Daniella Goldfarb, French–born Israeli chemist
 Daniella Guzman (born 1982), American journalist
 Daniella Hill (born 1991), American track and field athlete
 Daniella Jeflea (born 1987), Australian tennis player
 Daniella Kertesz (born 1989), Israeli actress
 Daniella Karagach, American ballroom dancer
 Daniella Kolodny, first female rabbi enlisted in the United States Naval Academy
 Daniella Kromm (born 2004), German rhythmic gymnast
 Daniella Levine Cava (born 1955), American lawyer, politician and social worker
 Daniella Lugassy (born 1982), Israeli operatic soprano
 Daniella Marques (born 1979), Brazilian economist
 Daniella Mastricchio (born 1987), Argentine actress and singer
 Daniella Melo (born 1998), American powerlifter
 Daniella Monet (born 1989), American actress and singer
 Daniella Ohad (born 1961), Israeli design historian, educator and writer
 Daniella Okeke, Nigerian actress
 Daniella Pavicic, Croatian–Canadian singer and songwriter
 Daniella Pellegrini (born 1982), South African television presenter and voice actress
 Daniella Perez (1970–1992), Brazilian actress and dancer
 Daniella Perkins (born 2000), American actress
 Daniella Pineda (born 1987), American actress
 Daniella Rabbani (born 1984), American singer and voice actress
 Daniella Rahme, Lebanese–Australian actress and television presenter
 Daniella Ribeiro (born 1972), Brazilian politician
 Daniella Rosas (born 2002), Peruvian surfer
 Daniella Rubinovitz, Dutch contemporary artist
 Daniella Sarahyba (born 1984), Brazilian model
 Daniella Shevel, South African footwear designer
 Daniella Smith (born 1972), New Zealand boxer
 Daniella Tilbury, Gibraltarian academic and educator
 Daniella Tobar, Chilean actress
 Daniella Vitale, American businesswoman
 Daniella Walcott (born 1991), Trinidadian model and painter
 Daniella Wang (born 1989), Chinese actress and fashion model
 Daniella Weiss (born 1945), Israeli activist

Danniella
 Danniella Westbrook, English actress

Danijela
Danijela Cabric, American electrical engineer
Danijela Dimitrovska, Serbian model
Danijela Martinović, Croatian singer
Danijela Rundqvist, Swedish ice hockey player
Danijela Stefanović, specializing in the history of ancient Egypt and Greece
Danijela Stojadinović, a politician in Serbia
Danijela Veljović, politician in Serbia
Danijela Vujičić, a politician in Serbia

See also

Hurricane Danielle (disambiguation)

English feminine given names
French feminine given names
Hebrew feminine given names
Irish feminine given names
Scottish feminine given names
Welsh feminine given names
Arabic feminine given names
Sammarinese given names